Georges Monier (18 February 1892 – 1974) was a Belgian composer. In 1920 he won a gold medal in the art competitions of the Olympic Games for his "Olympique" ("Olympic").

He was a co-founder of arts weekly-journal 7 Arts and led its musical section.

References

External links
 profile

1892 births
1974 deaths
Belgian composers
Male composers
Olympic gold medalists in art competitions
20th-century composers
Medalists at the 1920 Summer Olympics
Olympic competitors in art competitions
Art competitors at the 1920 Summer Olympics
20th-century Belgian male musicians